Deepak Raj Joshee was a Justice of the Supreme Court of Nepal. He was appointed as Acting Chief Justice of Supreme Court of Nepal on 19 March 2018. He had been recommended as the Chief Justice of Supreme Court of Nepal on 12 June 2018. He was rejected for Chief Justice of Supreme Court by the Parliamentary Hearing Special Committee on 3 August 2018.

See also
 Om Prakash Mishra
 Gopal Prasad Parajuli
 Sushila Karki

References

External links
Chief Justice of Nepal

Living people
Justices of the Supreme Court of Nepal
1954 births
People from Kathmandu District